Cavite City, officially the City of Cavite (Spanish and ), is a 4th class component city in the Philippines. According to the 2020 census, it has a population of 100,674 people.

The city was the capital of Cavite province from the latter's establishment in 1614 until 1954, when it was transferred to the newly created city of Trece Martires near the center of the province.  It was started as the small port town of Cavite Puerto that prospered during the early Spanish colonial period when it became the main seaport of Manila hosting the Manila-Acapulco galleon trade and the port used for other heavy and larger sea-bound ships. Thereafter, San Roque and La Caridad, two former independent towns of Cavite province, were later added to form one municipality.  The present larger Cavite City now includes the communities of San Antonio (includes Cañacao and Sangley Point), the southern districts of Santa Cruz and Dalahican, and the outlying islands of the province, including the historic Corregidor Island.

History

Etymology
The city has been known by at least two Tagalog names, the first being Tangway, which was the name given to the area by Tagalog settlers. Tangway simply means "peninsula". The second is Kawit or "hook", referring to the hook-shaped landform along the coast of Bacoor Bay, and from which the Chinese Keit and Spanish Cavite are in turn derived.

Pre-Hispanic era
The early inhabitants of Cavite City were the Tagalogs ruled by the Kampilan and the bullhorn of a datu, the tribal form of government.  According to folklore, the earliest settlers came from Borneo, led by Gat Hinigiw and his wife Dayang Kaliwanag who bore seven children. Archaeological evidences in the coastal areas show prehistoric settlements.

Spanish colonial period

On May 16, 1571, the Spanish conquistador Miguel López de Legazpi declared the region a royal encomienda, or royal land grant.  Spanish colonizers settled in the most populated area of the place (present day Kawit), they called it Cavite. The old Tangway at the tip of the Cavite Peninsula, across Bacoor Bay was referred to as Cavite la Punta meaning "Point of Cavite" or Cavite Point. Upon discovering that because of its deep waters, Cavite la Punta was a suitable place for the repair and construction of Spanish ships and galleon, the Spanish moved their settlement there and called it Cavite Nuevo (New Cavite) or plainly Cavite, while the first settlement was renamed "Cavite Viejo" (and in the early 20th century, regained its former name, Kawit).

In 1590, the Spaniards fortified Cavite Nuevo with a muralla (high thick curtain walls) on its western, northern and eastern side while the side fronting Bacoor Bay remained open.  Fort Guadalupe on the easternmost tip was also built at the same time, and the town became the Puerto de Cavite (Port of Cavite) or Cavite Puerto.  The Fort of San Felipe Neri and Porta Vaga gate were constructed in 1595 and completed in 1602. Puerta Vaga (corrupted to Porta Vaga) was the port city's barbican  western and only principal entrance from San Roque.  It was flanked by the western wall protected by two bastions at its north and southern end.  The wall and gate were also separated from the mainland by a moat, which also made the town like an island.

Cavite was officially founded as a town in 1614 with Tomás Salazar as the earliest known gobernadorcillo recorded.  At the same time, the town became the capital of the new politico-military province of Cavite, established also in 1614.  Like some other provinces during the Spanish era, the province adapted the name of its capital town [e.g., Bulacan, Bulacan; Tayabas, Tayabas (now Quezon province); Tarlac, Tarlac; Manila, Manila province ; Balayan, Balayan Province (now Batangas); Taal, Taal (now Batangas); and the present Batangas, Batangas].

San Roque was founded as a separate town also in 1614. At 1663, during the Spanish evacuation of Ternate, Indonesia, the 200 families of mixed Mexican-Filipino-Spanish and Papuan-Indonesian-Portuguese descent who had ruled over the Christianized Sultanate of Ternate and included their Sultan who converted, were relocated to Ternate, Cavite plus Ermita, Manila and San Roque, Cavite. It was placed under the civil administration of Cavite Puerto until it was granted a right to be a separate and an independent municipality in 1720. La Caridad, formerly known as La Estanzuela of San Roque, separated and was founded as town in 1868. The Spanish Governor General Jose de la Gardana granted the petition of the people led by Don Justo Miranda to make barrio La Estanzuela an independent town.

City of churches
As the town was progressing, it also became a cosmopolitan town that attracted the different religious orders to set up churches, convents and hospitals within the limited confines of the fortified town. The Franciscan Hospital de San Jose (Saint Joseph Hospital) was built for sailors and soldiers in 1591, the San Diego de Alcala convent in 1608, the Porta Vaga (La Ermita), Our Lady of Loreto (Jesuit), San Juan de Dios (St. John of God), Santo Domingo (Dominicans), Santa Monica (Recollects),  and San Pedro, the port's parish church. At the most, the fortified town enclosed eight churches, the Jesuit college of San Ildefonso, public buildings and residences, which served the needs of its population of natives, soldiers and workers at the port, transients and passengers on board the galleons.

It was also during those times when it was called "Tierra de Maria Santisima" (Land of Most Holy Mary) because of the popularity of the Marian devotion in this place.  Plazas and parks were evidence of importance, Plaza de Armas across from San Felipe Fort, Plaza de San Pedro across from the church and Plaza Soledad across from Porta Vaga, Plaza del Reparo was at the bayside.

Manila-Acapulco Galleon Trade

The Port of Cavite (Puerto de Cavite) was linked to the history of world trade. Spanish galleons sailed every July to Acapulco (Mexico) while another ship sailed from Acapulco to Cavite.  Galleons and other heavy ocean-going ships were not able to enter the Port of Manila along the Pasig River because of a sand bar that limits entrance to the river port only to light ships.  For this reason, the Port of Cavite was regarded as the Port of Manila, the main seaport of the capital city.

At the height of the Manila-Acapulco Galleon Trade, the Port of Cavite was the arrival and departure port of the Spanish galleons that brought many foreign travelers (Mostly Spaniards and Latinos) to its shores. The Port of Cavite was fondly called Ciudad de Oro Macizo meaning the "City of Solid Gold". The Chinese emperor at one time sent some of his men to this place they called Keit (Cavite) to search for gold. Marilola Perez in her 2015 Thesis "Cavite Chabacano Philippine Creole Spanish: Description and Typology" cites a large number of Mexicans settling in Cavite and spreading to Luzon, integrating into the local population and leading peasant revolts. Mexicans weren't the only Latin Americans in Cavite, as there were also a fair number of other Latin Americans, one such case was the Puerto Rican, Alonso Ramirez, who became a sailor in Cavite, and published the first Latin American novel entitled "Infortunios de Alonso Ramirez"

Between 1609 and 1616 the galleons Espiritu Santo and San Miguel were constructed in the shipyard of the port, called the Astillero de Rivera (Rivera Shipyard of Cavite), sometimes spelled as Ribera.

San Roque isthmus

The narrow San Roque isthmus or causeway (now M. Valentino Street) connected Cavite Puerto to San Roque town, its only border town.  Maps from the 17th century show that this narrow isthmus was wider, as wide as the town itself.  Problems with rising water and the encroaching waves that plagued Cavite Puerto since the beginning must have eroded the land into a narrow isthmus.

American colonial period

Control over the port was turned over to the Americans by Spain after the Treaty of Paris of 1898 at the turn of the 19th century. At the start of the American era, Cavite Puerto became the seat of the U.S. Naval Forces in the Philippines. It was redesigned to make way for modern ships and armaments.  The ruinous historical structures like Fort Guadalupe were demolished, along with most of Fort San Felipe.

Local government administration was under the renamed Presidentes municipales with the direct supervision of the American Army Officers (the first being Colonel Meade). The first Filipino Presidentes municipales were appointed: Don Zacaria Fortich for Cavite Puerto, Don Francisco Basa for San Roque, and Don Pedro Raqueño Bautista for Caridad.

In 1900, the Caviteños tasted their first election under the American regime. They elected in each pueblo or town, local officials called Presidente municipal, Vice-Presidente municipal and a Consejo (council) composed of Consejales (councilors). They elected Don Gregorio Basa as Presidente Municipal of the town now known as Cavite City.

In 1901, the Philippine Commission approved a municipal code as the organic law of all local governments throughout the country. In its implementation in 1903, the three separate pueblos of Cavite Puerto, San Roque and La Caridad were merged into one municipality, which was called the Municipality of Cavite. By virtue of a legislative act promulgated by the First Philippine Assembly, Cavite was again made the capital of the province. Subsequently, its territory was enlarged to include the district of San Antonio and the island of Corregidor. The Municipality of Cavite functioned as a civil government whose officials consisted of a Presidente Municipal, a Vice-Presidente Municipal and ten Consejales duly elected by the qualified voters of the municipality.

In 1909, Executive Order No. 124, of Governor-General W. Cameron Forbes, declared the Act No. 1748 annexing Corregidor and the islands of Caballo (Fort Hughes), La Monja, El Fraile (Fort Drum), Santa Amalia, Carabao (Fort Frank) and Limbones, as well as all waters and detached rocks surrounding them, to the Municipality of Cavite.

Cityhood

Under the Philippine Commonwealth, Assemblyman Manuel S. Roxas, sponsored Commonwealth Act No. 547 elevating Cavite town to a chartered city. Upon approval into law on September 7, 1940, the executive function of the city was vested in a City Mayor appointed by the President of the Philippine Commonwealth. The legislative body of the City of Cavite was vested on a Municipal Board composed of three electives, two appointive and two ex-officio councilors, the presiding officer of which is the City Mayor.

World War II

On December 10, 1941, two days after an attack that had destroyed American air defenses at Clark Field and three days after the Japanese attack on Pearl Harbor, Japanese Imperial Forces destroyed Cavite Naval Base and bombed Cavite City.

Later, after Japan seized the Philippines, Japanese leaders appointed at least two city mayors of Cavite City.

The island of Corregidor played an important role during the Japanese invasion of the Philippines. The island was the site of two costly sieges and pitched battles—the first during the first months of 1942, and the second in January 1945—between the Imperial Japanese Army and the U.S. Army, along with its smaller subsidiary force, the Philippine Army.

In 1945 during the fight for the liberation of the country from Japanese hands, the US and Philippine Commonwealth military bombarded the Japanese forces stationed in the city, completely destroying the old historic port city of Cavite. The old walls and the Porta Vaga gate were damaged. Most of the structures were destroyed while some of the church towers remained.  The city was littered with bomb craters.

After the war, the city's local administration resumed the way it was before the war.  The walls, gate and ruins of the old city were later removed. Only the bell tower of the Santa Monica Church of the Recollects and the two bastions of Fort San Felipe remain of the old city.

Transfer of provincial capital
Republic Act No. 981, passed by the Congress of the Philippines in 1954, transferred the capital of the province from Cavite City to the newly established Trece Martires. Subsequently, the city charter was amended. By virtue of an amendment to the charter of Cavite City, the City Mayor, City Vice Mayor and eight councilors were elected by popular suffrage.  The first election of city officials was held in 1963.

Contemporary history
In 1972, Mayor Manuel S. Rojas was assassinated in the nearby town of Bacoor, Cavite.

Reclamation

In the latter part of 1960s or early 1970s, the land adjacent to the San Roque isthmus was reclaimed.  The new land is now occupied by the San Sebastian College – Recoletos de Cavite and some residential houses.  The present Cavite City Hall is built where the north tower end of the western wall was, which was already partly reclaimed by 1945.

Half of the old port city, including Fort San Felipe, is now occupied by Naval Base Cavite and is closed to the public.  The old historic core of Cavite is now part of the San Roque district of Cavite City and is referred today as either Fort San Felipe or Porta Vaga.  The former location of the Porta Vaga gate, the western wall and its towers are now occupied by the Governor Samonte Park.

Geography

The City of Cavite occupies most of the hook-shaped Cavite Peninsula that juts into Manila Bay. The peninsula is bounded by Bacoor Bay to the southeast.  The peninsula ends at two tips – Sangley Point and Cavite Point. Cañacao Bay is the body of water formed between Sangley Point and Cavite Point.  The latter was the location of the old historic Port of Cavite.  Both Bacoor and Cañacao Bays are inland bays of the larger Manila Bay.  The city's only land border is the Municipality of Noveleta to the south.

Sangley Point, the former location of the United States Sangley Point Naval Base, is the northernmost part of the city, peninsula and province. The former American military naval base has since been converted into a Philippine military base.

The historic island of Corregidor, the adjacent islands and detached rocks of Caballo, Carabao, El Fraile and La Monja found at the mouth of Manila Bay are part of the city's territorial jurisdiction.

Climate
Cavite city has a tropical wet and dry climate (Köppen climate classification Aw), with pronounced dry season from December to April and quite lengthy wet season from May to November that brings abundant rainfall into the city.

Subdivisions
The city proper is divided into five districts: Dalahican, Santa Cruz, Caridad, San Antonio, and San Roque. These districts are further subdivided into eight zones and a total of 84 barangays.

Barangays

Cavite City is politically subdivided into 84 barangays.

 Barangay 1 (Hen. M. Alvarez)
 Barangay 2 (Hen. C. Tirona)
 Barangay 3 (Hen. E. Aguinaldo)
 Barangay 4 (Hen. M. Trias)
 Barangay 5 (Hen. E. Evangelista)
 Barangay 6 (Diego Silang)
 Barangay 7 (Kapitan Kong)
 Barangay 8 (Manuel S. Rojas)
 Barangay 9 (Kanaway)
 Barangay 10-M (Kingfisher)
 Barangay 10-A (Kingfisher A)
 Barangay 10-B (Kingfisher B)
 Barangay 11 (Lawin)
 Barangay 12 (Love Bird)
 Barangay 13 (Aguila)
 Barangay 14 (Loro)
 Barangay 15 (Kilyawan)
 Barangay 16 (Martines)
 Barangay 17 (Kalapati)
 Barangay 18 (Maya/Pisces)
 Barangay 19 (Gemini)
 Barangay 20 (Virgo)
 Barangay 21 (Scorpio)
 Barangay 22 (Leo)
 Barangay 22-A (Leo A)
 Barangay 23 (Aquarius)
 Barangay 24 (Libra)
 Barangay 25 (Capricorn)
 Barangay 26 (Cancer)
 Barangay 27 (Sagittarius)
 Barangay 28 (Taurus)
 Barangay 29 (Lao-lao/Aries)
 Barangay 29-A (Lao-lao A/Aries A)
 Barangay 30 (Bid-bid)
 Barangay 31 (Maya-maya)
 Barangay 32 (Salay-salay)
 Barangay 33 (Buwan-buwan)
 Barangay 34 (Lapu-lapu)
 Barangay 35 (Hasa-hasa)
 Barangay 36 (Sap-Sap)
 Barangay 36-A (Sap-sap A)
 Barangay 37-M (Cadena de Amor)
 Barangay 37-A (Cadena de Amor A)
 Barangay 38 (Sampaguita)
 Barangay 38-A (Sampaguita A)
 Barangay 39 (Jasmin)
 Barangay 40 (Gumamela)
 Barangay 41 (Rosal)
 Barangay 42 (Pinagbuklod)
 Barangay 42-A (Pinagbuklod A)
 Barangay 42-B (Pinagbuklod B)
 Barangay 42-C (Pinagbuklod C)
 Barangay 43 (Pinagpala)
 Barangay 44 (Maligaya)
 Barangay 45 (Kaunlaran)
 Barangay 45-A (Kaunlaran A)
 Barangay 46 (Sinagtala)
 Barangay 47 (Pagkakaisa)
 Barangay 47-A (Pagkakaisa A)
 Barangay 47-B (Pagkakaisa B)
 Barangay 48 (Narra)
 Barangay 48-A (Narra A)
 Barangay 49 (Akasya)
 Barangay 49-A (Akasya A)
 Barangay 50 (Kabalyero)
 Barangay 51 (Kamagong)
 Barangay 52 (Ipil)
 Barangay 53 (Yakal)
 Barangay 53-A (Yakal A)Air Force
 Barangay 53-B (Yakal B)Navy
 Barangay 54-A (Pechay A)
 Barangay 54-M (Pechay)
 Barangay 55 (Ampalaya)
 Barangay 56 (Labanos)
 Barangay 57 (Repolyo)
 Barangay 58 (Patola)
 Barangay 58-A (Patola A)
 Barangay 59 (Sitaw)
 Barangay 60 (Letsugas)
 Barangay 61 (Talong; Poblacion)
 Barangay 61-A (Talong A; Poblacion)
 Barangay 62 (Kangkong; Poblacion)
 Barangay 62-A (Kangkong A; Poblacion)
 Barangay 62-B (Kangkong B; Poblacion)

Demographics

Religion

According to 2000 census data, Christianity is the most prevalent religion in Cavite City, where a majority of Caviteños practice Roman Catholicism. Other Christian religious groups in the city include the Aglipayan Church, Iglesia Ni Cristo (I.N.C), Jehovah's Witnesses, United Church of Christ in the Philippines (UCCP), Jesus Is Lord Church (JIL), The United Methodist Church, Presbyterian Churches, Baptists and Bible Fundamental churches, Seventh-day Adventist Church, Members Church of God International or Ang Dating Daan, The Church of Jesus Christ of Latter Day Saints, and other UPC churches. A Muslim minority is also present in the city.

Nuestra Señora de la Soledad de Porta Vaga 
The Nuestra Señora de la Soledad de Porta Vaga (Our Lady of Solitude of Porta Vaga) is the patroness of Cavite City. She is revered by Catholics as the Celestial Guardian and Protector of the entire Province of Cavite since her arrival in Cavite shore.  The image of Our Lady of Porta Vaga is designated as a National Cultural Treasure by the National Museum. This is the oldest existing dated Marian painting in the Philippines.

The image of the virgin is painted on a canvas.  The virgin is depicted as a lady in mourning. Mary, garbed in black and white attire, seems to be on her knees as she contemplates the passion of her son. Before her are the crown of thorns and the nails instrument of Christ's passion.  An inscription was found at the back of the painting – A doze de Abril 1692 años Juan Oliba puso esta Stma. Ymagen Haqui, which means,"The sacred image was placed here by Juan Oliba on April 12, 1692". This particular icon was used to bless the galleon plying between Cavite and Acapulco (Mexico) during formal sending off ceremonies. Thus, she was also called the Patroness of the Galleons.

The image was originally enshrined at the Ermita de Porta Vaga, a small church located adjacent to the Porta Vaga gate of Cavite Puerto and was destroyed during the last world war.  The image is presently enshrined at the San Roque Parish Church, one of the three parishes in the city.

Languages
Chabacano is a Spanish-influenced creole language formerly spoken by majority of the people living in the city of Cavite. Chabacano emerged sometime after the arrival of the first Spaniards and Mexicans in the late 16th century. During this period, the people that lived near the military arsenal in Cavite City put themselves in contact with the Spaniards and Mexicans and began to incorporate in their own dialect many Spanish words, which then gave birth to the creole. Majority of residents today speak Tagalog.

Today, Chabacano is generally considered to be dying with only a fraction of the people, mostly elderly, able to speak the language. According to the Philippine professor, Alfredo B. German who wrote a thesis on the grammar in Chabacano dialect, the present conditions no longer favor the disenrolment of the same one. There are many probable reasons for the diminishing of Chabacano, among these being the massive arrival of Tagalog-speaking migrants to the city of Cavite, and intermarriage.

One of the poets and Philippine writers, Jesus Balmori expressed himself in Chabacano. He was a great admirer of the dialect and wrote several verses in it. Another admirer of this dialect was Don Jaime de Veyra, the illustrious writer and famous Philippine historian, who feared more than all the probable extinction of the Chabacano when he wrote the following prophetic lines, "I am afraid that the inevitable absorption of the "Tagalog invasion" on one side and the invasion of the English on the other hand, will wipe out or extinguish this inherited Castilian language in existence with his last representatives in the following generation." Professor Gervacio Miranda who also wrote a book in Chabacano said in his preface the following thing, "My only objective to write this book is to possibly conserve in written form the Chabacano of Cavite for posterity," fearing the extinction of the dialect.

Economy

Culture

Festivals and events 

The city is home to the Annual Cavite City Water Festival or Regada, held every 17th and 24th day of June. It is a festive and religious celebration of the feast of St. John the Baptist. Regada started in 1996 and features the "Paulan" or "Basayawan", which is a street party where celebrators dance under water sprinklers. Another celebration is the Feast for the Our Lady of Solitude of Porta Vaga, which is annually observed by local Catholics during every second Sunday of November.

Other notable holidays include the observance of Julián Felipe's birthday (January 28). Felipe, who composed the Philippine National Anthem, was born and raised in Cavite City. The city's Charter Day, known locally as simply Cavite City Day, which commemorates the signing of the city charter in 1940, is held every September 7.

Cuisine 
Food in Cavite City is influenced by its Spanish heritage combined with Filipino tradition. One popular native dish is bacalao (sauteed codfish), which is served during the Lenten season. A variation of bibingka locally known as bibingkang samala can also be found in the city. This delicacy is made of glutinous rice (malagkit), coconut milk and sugar.

Infrastructure

Transportation 
The only road connecting Cavite City to the rest of Luzon is the National Route 62, which begins at P. Burgos Avenue in Caridad district and continues towards Noveleta as the Manila–Cavite Road (not to be confused with Manila-Cavite Expressway). A proposal to construct an expressway from Kawit to Cavite City via Bacoor Bay has been raised to the Department of Public Works and Highways (DPWH). When realized, the expressway would serve as a link to Manila-Cavite Expressway (CAVITEx).

Cavite City has one airport, Danilo Atienza Air Base, located at Sangley Point. The airport is operated by the Philippine Air Force. It was formerly a US Naval Base, called Naval Station Sangley Point, until it was turned over to the Philippine government in 1971. There are proposals to convert the base into a civilian airport, as a solution to the overcrowding of Ninoy Aquino International Airport.

As of 2019, no active water-based public transportation services were based in Cavite City. Metrostar Ferry, which began operations in 2007, used to serve trips from San Roque district to Pasay, Metro Manila. A new service from the Intramuros district of Manila to the nearby town of Noveleta to the south debuted in January 2018 and is currently the nearest water-based transport to the city.

Utilities 
Water services are currently provided by Maynilad. Meanwhile, electric services are currently provided by Meralco.

Symbols

Flag

The flag of the city created by Mayor Timoteo O. Encarnacion, Jr. and was adopted by the Sangguniang Panlungsod through Resolution No. 95-081 dated September 6, 1995, in time for the 55th Cavite City Charter Day.  The meaning, symbol and significance of the flag components:
 The two red strips symbolize courage and bravery.
 The middle green strip symbolizes progress and advancement
 The half sun has a twofold meaning. If the rising sun, it means the hope, dreams and visions for progress. If the setting sun, it stands for the sunset that can be seen in the city's western shores.
 The five yellow stars symbolize the five districts of Cavite City.
 The three sets of waves below the half sun, in three colors of navy blue, light blue and white. It signifies that Cavite City is a peninsula surrounded by water while the three colors represent Cañacao Bay, Bacoor Bay and Manila Bay.

Seal

The current seal of the city was designed by Mayor Timoteo O. Encarnacion, Jr. It was adopted by the Sangguniang Panlungsod through Resolution No. 140-90, then approved by the Local Executive on September 7, 1990. On November 3, 1993, the National Historical Institute and the president, through the Department of the Interior and Local Government issued a Certificate of Registration recognizing the new seal.

The shield stands for bravery and fortitude. The colors red, white, blue, yellow stand for the loyalty of the people to its government. The inclusion of the rays portrays the role of Cavite as one of the original provinces that rose up in arms against Spanish domination in 1896 in the Philippine Revolution.

The white triangle inscribed within the shield with the letters KKK at the corners represents the part played by The city in the organization of the Katipunan. Don Ladislao Diwa of the city was one of the triumvirate who organized the patriotic group. Many Katipuneros came from the city.

Within the white triangle are symbols representing various events:
 At the bottom of the triangle is a fort with figures "1872" symbolizing the Cavite mutiny of 1872 at the Cavite Arsenal.
 At the background is a map of the city including the island of Corregidor representing the role of the island in the city's history.
 The obelisk at the left memorializes the Thirteen Martyrs of Cavite who were executed by the Spaniards on September 12, 1896.
 The sheet music at the right symbolizes Julián Felipe, composer of the Philippine National Anthem who was from the city, .
 The fort symbol representing the Royal Fort of San Felipe and its role in the city and country's history being the place where the Thirteen Martyrs of Cavite were detained and where the Cavite mutiny of 1872 took place.
 The scroll on the uppermost portion of the triangle contains the City motto "Para Dios y Patria" ("For God and Country") in Chabacano dialect to emphasize the native dialect of the city.
 The green laurel leaf encircling the right and left portions of the KKK triangle symbolizes victories by reason.

Education

Notable personalities

Julián Felipe
Ladislao Diwa
Roman Basa
Ruffy Biazon
Joel Lamangan
Dino Reyes Chua
Ferdinand Topacio
Kesz Váldez
Efren Peñaflorida
Leopoldo Salcedo
Nash Aguas
Celeste Legaspi
Ronnie Del Carmen
Dominic Roque
Eros Atalia
DJ eL Reynolds
Mercedes Matias-Santiago
Timoteo O. Encarnacion, Jr.

Sister cities
Cavite City has one sister city, as designated by Sister Cities International:
  Melilla, Spain
  San Diego, California, United States

See also
Naval Base Manila

References

External links

 Official  Cavite City Government website
 Official Website of the Cavite City Library and Museum
 [ Philippine Standard Geographic Code]
 Philippine Census Information

 
Cities in Cavite
Populated places on Manila Bay
Port cities and towns in the Philippines
Former provincial capitals of the Philippines
1614 establishments in the Philippines
Populated places established in 1614
Component cities in the Philippines